In mathematics, the exponential response formula (ERF), also known as exponential response and complex replacement, is a method used to find a particular solution of a non-homogeneous linear ordinary differential equation of any order. The exponential response formula is applicable to non-homogeneous linear ordinary differential equations with constant coefficients if the function is polynomial, sinusoidal, exponential or the combination of the three. The general solution of a non-homogeneous linear ordinary differential equation is a superposition of the general solution of the associated homogeneous ODE and a particular solution to the non-homogeneous ODE. 
Alternative methods for solving ordinary differential equations of higher order are method of undetermined coefficients and method of variation of parameters.

Context and method

Applicability 
Then, the exponential response formula can be applied to each term of the right side of such equation. Due to linearity, the exponential response formula can be applied as long as the right side has terms, which are added together by the superposition principle.

Complex replacement 

Complex replacement is a method of converting a non-homogeneous term of equation into a complex exponential function, which makes a given differential equation a complex exponential.

Consider differential equation .

To make complex replacement, Euler's formula can be used;

Complex replacement is used for solving differential equations when the non-homogeneous term is expressed in terms of a sinusoidal function or an exponential function, which can be converted into a complex exponential function differentiation and integration. Such complex exponential function is easier to manipulate than the original function.

When the non-homogeneous term is expressed as an exponential function, the ERF method or the undetermined coefficients method can be used to find a particular solution. If non-homogeneous terms can not be transformed to complex exponential function, then the Lagrange method of variation of parameters can be used to find solutions.

Linear time-invariant operator 

The differential equations are important in simulating natural phenomena. In particular, there are numerous phenomena described as high order linear differential equations, for example the spring vibration, LRC circuit, beam deflection, signal processing, control theory and LTI systems with feedback loops. 

Mathematically, the system is time-invariant if whenever the input  has response  then for any constant "a", the input  has response . Physically, time invariance means system’s response does not depend on what time the input begins. For example, if a spring-mass system is at equilibrium, it will respond to a given force in the same way, no matter when the force was applied.

When the time-invariant system is also linear, it is called a linear time-invariant system (LTI system). Most of these LTI systems are derived from linear differential equations, where the non-homogeneous term is called the input signal and solution of the non-homogeneous equations is called the response signal. If the input signal is given exponentially, the corresponding response signal also changes exponentially.

Considering the following th order linear differential equation 

and denoting

where  are the constant coefficients, produces differential operator , which is linear and time-invariant and known as the LTI operator. The operator,  is obtained from its characteristic polynomial;

by formally replacing the indeterminate s here with the differentiation operator 

Therefore, the equation (1) can be written as

Problem setting and ERF method 

Then, a particular solution is

provide only that .

Proof: Due to linearity of operator , the equation can be written as

 

On the other hand, since 

substituting this into equation (3), produces

Therefore,  is a particular solution to the non-homogeneous differential equation.

Thus, the above equation for a particular response  is called the exponential response formula (ERF) for the given exponential input.

and is called the resonant response formula.

Example 

Let's find the particular solution to 2nd order linear non-homogeneous ODE;

Also, the non-homogeneous term,  can be written as follows

First, considering non-homogeneous term, .

from the ERF, a particular solution corresponding to  can be found.

 .

   

Let's find a particular solution to DE corresponding to 3rd term;

In order to do this, equation must be replaced by complex-valued equation, of which it is the real part:

Applying the exponential response formula (ERF), produces

and the real part is

Therefore, the particular solution of given equation,  is

Comparison with method of undetermined coefficients 

The undetermined coefficients method is a method of appropriately selecting a solution type according to the form of the non-homogeneous term and determining the undetermined constant, so that it satisfies the non-homogeneous equation. On the other hand, the ERF method obtains a special solution based on differential operator. Similarity for both methods is that special solutions of non-homogeneous linear differential equations with constant coefficients are obtained, while form of the equation in consideration is the same in both methods.

Substituting into the equation to determine the tentative constant yields 

 

therefore 

The particular solution can be found in form:

    
On the other hand, the exponential response formula method requires characteristic polynomial  to be found, after which the non-homogeneous terms  is complex replaced. The particular solution is then found using formula

Generalized exponential response formula 

Let  be a polynomial operator with constant coefficients, and  its -th derivative. Then ODE 
, where  is real or complex.
has the particular solution as following.
 
.

  but .

 but . In this case, a particular solution will be given by

Above equation is called generalized exponential response formula.

Example 

To find a particular solution of the following ODE;

By the calculating, we get the following:

 

Original exponential response formula is not applicable to this case due to division by zero. Therefore, using the generalized exponential response formula and calculated constants, particular solution is

Application examples

Motion of object hanging from a spring 
Object hanging from a spring with displacement . The force acting is gravity, spring force, air resistance, and any other external forces.   
 
From Hooke’s law, the motion equation of object is expressed as follows;

where  is external force.

Therefore, the harmonic oscillator with sinusoidal forcing term is expressed as following:

 

Then, a particular solution is

 

Applying complex replacement and the ERF: if  is a solution to the complex DE

then  will be a solution to the given DE.

However, since , then . Thus, the resonant case of the ERF gives

Electrical circuits 
Considering the electric current flowing through an electric circuit, consisting of a resistance, a capacitor, a coil wires, and a battery, connected in series. 

This system is described by an integral-differential equation found by Kirchhoff called Kirchhoff’s voltage law, relating the resistor , capacitor , inductor , battery , and the current  in a circuit as follows,

Differentiating both sides of the above equation, produces the following ODE.

Now, assuming , where  . ( is called resonance frequency in LRC circuit). Under above assumption, the output (particular solution) corresponding to input  can be found. In order to do it, given input can be converted in complex form:

Therefore, from the ERF, a particular solution can be obtained as follows;

Complex gain and phase lag 
Considering the general LTI system

In case that , a particular solution to given equation is

Considering the following concepts used in physics and signal processing mainly.

This has the same units as the input quantity.
It has units of radians/time. Often it will be referred to it as frequency, even though technically frequency should have units of cycles/time.
This has the same units as the response quantity. 
The gain is the factor that the input amplitude is multiplied by to get the amplitude of the response. It has the units needed to convert input units to output units.
The phase lag has units of radians, i.e. it’s dimensionless.
This has units of time. It is the time that peak of the output lags behind that of the input.
This is the factor that the complex input is multiplied by to get the complex output.

References

External links 
 Operators and the exponential response formula
 Generalized exponential response formula
 Basics of LTI operators and ERF

Differential equations
Ordinary differential equations